Willie Simmons is the name of:

 Willie Lee Simmons (born 1947), American politician, former Mississippi state senator
 Willie Simmons (American football) (born 1980), American college football head coach and former player
 Willie Simmons (inmate) (born 1957), American sentenced to life without possibility of parole for stealing $9
 Willie Simmons (association football), member of the Bermuda national football team since 2016
 Willie Simmons (basketball), American who played in the Australian National Basketball League (1986–2003) - see 1988 NBL Finals

See also
 Robert Simmons House, also known as the Willie Simmons House, Saint Helena Island, South Carolina, United States, on the National Register of Historic Places
 William Simmons (disambiguation)